Jeffrey Tate (born 17 November 1959) is an English former professional association footballer who played as a central midfielder. He played five matches in the Football League for Burnley. Also playing for Wallsend Boys Club, England schoolboys, Morecambe FC, Mossley FC and finished his career at West Didsbury & Chorlton.

References

1959 births
Living people
People from Blyth, Northumberland
Footballers from Northumberland
English footballers
Association football midfielders
Burnley F.C. players
Morecambe F.C. players
English Football League players
Wallsend Boys Club players